The Blue Engine 4 or BE-4 is an oxygen-rich liquefied-methane-fueled staged-combustion rocket engine under development by Blue Origin. The BE-4 is being developed with private and public funding. The engine has been designed to produce  of thrust at sea level.

It was initially planned for the engine to be used exclusively on a Blue Origin proprietary launch vehicle New Glenn, the company's first orbital rocket. However, it was announced in 2014 that the engine would also be used on the United Launch Alliance (ULA) Vulcan Centaur launch vehicle, the successor to the Atlas V launch vehicle. Final engine selection by ULA happened in September 2018.

Although previously planned to fly as early as 2019, the first flight test of the new engine is now expected no earlier than 2023 on the Vulcan rocket. The engine is running three years behind , and Blue Origin has experienced a number of problems, both technical and managerial, with the engine development program, leaving the engine still not yet flight-qualified. Pathfinder engines are currently undergoing testing at ULA facilities, and the first two flight engines were delivered to ULA for integration with the Vulcan Centaur rocket on October 31st, 2022.

History
Following Aerojet's acquisition of Pratt & Whitney Rocketdyne in 2012, Blue Origin president Rob Meyerson saw an opportunity to fill a gap in the defense industrial base. Blue Origin publicly entered the liquid rocket engine business by partnering with ULA on the development of the BE-4, and working with other companies. Meyerson announced the selection of Huntsville, AL as the location of Blue Origin's rocket production factory in June 2017.

Blue Origin began work on the BE-4 in 2011, although no public announcement was made until September 2014. This was their first engine to combust liquid oxygen and liquified natural gas propellants. In September 2014—in a choice labeled "a stunner" by SpaceNews—the large launch vehicle manufacturer and launch service provider United Launch Alliance selected the BE-4 as the main engine for a new primary launch vehicle.  Blue Origin said the "BE-4 would be 'ready for flight' by 2017."

By April 2015, two parallel development programs were under way. One program was testing full-scale versions of the BE-4 powerpack, which are the set of valves and turbopumps that provide the proper fuel/oxidizer mix to the injectors and combustion chamber. The second program was testing subscale versions of the engine's injectors. The company planned to begin full-scale engine testing in late 2016 and expected to complete development of the engine in 2017.
By September 2015, Blue Origin had completed more than 100 development tests of several elements of the BE-4, including the preburner and a "regeneratively-cooled thrust chamber using multiple full-scale injector elements". The tests were used to confirm the theoretical model predictions of "injector performance, heat transfer, and combustion stability", and data collected was being used to refine the engine design. There was an explosion on the test stand during 2015 during powerpack testing.  Blue Origin built two larger and redundant test stands to follow, capable of testing the full thrust of the BE-4.

In January 2016, Blue Origin announced that they intended to begin testing full engines of the BE-4 on ground test stands prior to the end of 2016. Following a factory tour in March 2016, journalist Eric Berger noted that a large part of "Blue Origin's factory has been given over to development of the Blue Engine-4".

Initially, both first-stage and second-stage versions of the engine were planned.  The second stage of the initial New Glenn design was to have shared the same stage diameter as the first stage and use a single vacuum-optimized BE-4, the BE-4U.  In the event, they backed away from this plan.

The first engine was fully assembled in March 2017.  Also in March, United Launch Alliance indicated that the economic risk of the Blue Origin engine selection option had been retired, but that the technical risk on the project would remain until a series of engine firing tests were completed later in 2017. A test anomaly occurred on 13 May 2017 and Blue Origin reported that they lost a set of powerpack hardware.

In June 2017, Blue Origin announced that they would build a new facility in Huntsville, Alabama to manufacture the large BE-4 cryogenic rocket engine.

The BE-4 was first test fired, at 50% thrust for 3 seconds, in October 2017.  By March 2018, the BE-4 engine had been tested at 65% of design thrust for 114 seconds with a goal expressed in May to achieve 70% of design thrust in the next several months.  By September 2018, multiple hundreds of seconds of engine testing had been completed, including one test of over 200 seconds duration.

In October 2018, Blue Origin President Bob Smith announced that the first launch of the New Glenn had been moved back to 2021, and in 2021 an additional slip to late 2022 was announced. This caused the first flight test of the BE-4 to be scheduled for the initial Vulcan Centaur launch rather than on New Glenn.

By August 2019, BE-4 was undergoing full power engine tests.

In July 2020, the first pathfinder BE-4 was delivered to United Launch Alliance for integration testing with Vulcan Centaur.

In August 2020, ULA CEO Tory Bruno stated that the second test BE-4 would be delivered soon, followed quickly by the first flight-qualified ones. He noted an ongoing issue with the BE-4's turbopumps. At the time, Blue Origin was still troubleshooting the 75,000-horsepower pumps that bring fuel to the BE-4's main combustion chamber, Bruno said, adding that he was confident the issues would be resolved soon. In October, Bruno stated that the issue was resolved and that the engine was moved into production. In the event, it was not, and would not be until 2022.

On October 31st, 2022, a Twitter post by the official Blue Origin account announced that the first two BE-4 engines had been delivered to ULA and were in the process of being integrated on a Vulcan rocket. In a later tweet, ULA CEO Tory Bruno said that one of the engines had already been installed on the booster, and that the other would be joining it momentarily.

Applications 

By 2017, the BE-4 was being considered for use on two launch vehicles then under development.  Prior to this, a modified derivative of the BE-4 was also being considered for the experimental XS-1 spaceplane for a US military project, but was not selected.  By 2018, it was the selected engine for both the Blue Origin New Glenn and the ULA Vulcan launch vehicles.

Vulcan 

In late 2014, Blue Origin signed an agreement with United Launch Alliance to co-develop the BE-4 engine and to commit to use the new engine on the Vulcan launch vehicle, a successor to the Atlas V, which would replace the Russian-made RD-180 engine. Vulcan will use two of the  BE-4 engines on each first stage.  The engine development program began in 2011.

The ULA partnership announcement came after months of uncertainty about the future of the Russian RD-180 engine that has been used in the ULA Atlas V rocket for over a decade.  Geopolitical concerns had come about that created serious concerns about the reliability and consistency of the supply chain for the procurement of the Russian engine.  Initially, ULA expected the first flight of the new launch vehicle no earlier than 2019 but by 2018, that target had moved out to 2021.

Since early 2015, the BE-4 had been in competition with the AR1 engine for the Atlas V RD-180 replacement program. While the BE-4 is a liquified natural gas engine, the AR1, like the RD-180, is kerosene-fueled.

Initially, only  was to be disbursed by the government with  additional to be spent by a ULA subsidiary on Vulcan BE-4 development. ARR put no additional private funds into the engine development effort after early 2018.

Bezos noted in 2016 that the Vulcan launch vehicle is being designed around the BE-4 engine; ULA switching to the AR1 would require significant delays and money on the part of ULA.  This point had also been made by ULA executives, who clarified that the BE-4 is likely to cost 40% less than the AR1, as well as benefit from Bezos capacity to "make split-second investment decisions on behalf of BE-4, and has already demonstrated his determination to see it through. [whereas the] AR1, in contrast, depends mainly on U.S. government backing, meaning Aerojet Rocketdyne has many phone numbers to dial to win support".

New Glenn 

The engine is to be used on the Blue Origin large orbital launch vehicle New Glenn, a -diameter two-stage orbital launch vehicle with an optional third stage and a reusable first stage.  The first flight and orbital test is planned for no earlier than late 2022, although the company had earlier expected the BE-4 might be tested on a rocket flight as early as 2020.

The first stage will be powered by seven BE-4 engines and will be reusable, landing vertically.  The second stage of New Glenn will share the same diameter and use two BE-3 vacuum-optimized LH2/LOX engines. The second stage will be expendable.

XS-1 

Boeing secured a contract to design and build the DARPA XS-1 reusable spaceplane in 2014.  The XS-1 was to accelerate to hypersonic speed at the edge of the Earth's atmosphere to enable its payload to reach orbit.  In 2015, it was believed a modified derivative of the BE-4 engine was to power the craft.  In 2017, the contract award selected the RS-25-derived Aerojet Rocketdyne AR-22 engine instead. The XS-1 was cancelled in 2020.

Availability and use 
Blue Origin has indicated that they intend to make the engine commercially available, once development is complete, to companies beyond ULA, and also plans to utilize the engine in Blue Origin's own new orbital launch vehicle.  As of March 2016, Orbital ATK was also evaluating Blue Origin engines for its launch vehicles.

The BE-4 uses liquified natural gas rather than more commonly used rocket fuels such as kerosene. This approach allows for autogenous pressurization, which is the use of gasified propellant to pressurize liquid propellant. This is beneficial because it eliminates the need for pressurization systems that require the storage of a pressurizing gas, such as helium.

Although all early BE-4 components and full engines to support the test program were built at Blue's headquarters location in Kent, Washington, production of the BE-4 will be in Huntsville, Alabama.

Technical specifications 
The BE-4 is a staged-combustion engine, with a single oxygen-rich preburner, and a single turbine driving both the fuel and oxygen pumps. The cycle is similar to the kerosene-fueled RD-180 currently used on the Atlas V, although it uses only a single combustion chamber and nozzle.

The BE-4 is designed for long life and high reliability, partially by aiming the engine to be a "medium-performing version of a high-performance architecture".  Hydrostatic bearings are used in the turbopumps rather than the more typical ball and roller bearings specifically to increase reliability and service life.
 Thrust (sea level):  at full power

 Designed for reusability — up to 100 flights and landings
 Relightable in-flight via head-pressure start of the turbine during coast
 Deep throttling capability to 40% power or lower

See also 
 BE-3 – hydrogen-fueled engine currently in operation by Blue Origin
 Raptor – methane-fueled engine developed by SpaceX
 Merlin – kerosene-fueled operational engine by SpaceX
 RD-180 – modern Russian kerosene-fueled engine of comparable size
 Comparison of orbital rocket engines

References

External links 
 ULA February 2016 statement following US Air Force partial-funding of BE-4 development

 
 

Blue Origin rocket engines
Rocket engines using methane propellant
Rocket engines using the staged combustion cycle
Rocket engines of the United States